Lophocampa scripta is a moth of the family Erebidae. It was described by Augustus Radcliffe Grote in 1867. It is found on Cuba.

References

 Natural History Museum Lepidoptera generic names catalog

scripta
Moths described in 1867
Endemic fauna of Cuba